James Barry was a member of the Wisconsin State Assembly.

Biography
Barry was born on March 17, 1812, in County Londonderry, Ireland. He was a member of the United Presbyterian Church of North America. On January 22, 1836, he married Elizabeth Porter. Barry died on November 12, 1883.

Career
Barry was a member of the Wisconsin State Assembly during the 1879 session. Other positions he held include chairman of the Town of Pepin and member of the Pepin County, Wisconsin Board of Supervisors. He was a Republican.

References

External links

Politicians from County Londonderry
Irish emigrants to the United States (before 1923)
People from Pepin, Wisconsin
19th-century Presbyterians
Republican Party members of the Wisconsin State Assembly
Mayors of places in Wisconsin
County supervisors in Wisconsin
1812 births
1883 deaths
Burials in Wisconsin
19th-century American politicians